Philipp Neuenschwander (born December 29, 1964) is a retired Swiss professional ice hockey forward who last played for EV Zug in the National League A. He also represented the Swiss national team at the 1988 Winter Olympics.

References

External links

1964 births
Living people
EV Zug players
HC Davos players
Ice hockey players at the 1988 Winter Olympics
Olympic ice hockey players of Switzerland
Swiss ice hockey forwards